Pseudomonas vranovensis is a Gram-negative soil bacterium.

References

External links
Type strain of Pseudomonas vranovensis at BacDive -  the Bacterial Diversity Metadatabase

Pseudomonadales
Bacteria described in 2006